Series Two of Ninja Warrior UK, a British physical obstacle assault course game show, was aired on ITV during 2016, from 2 January to 13 February. Prior to the final episode of the previous series, the broadcaster decided it would renew the show for a second series, making the announcement on 29 May 2015. Of the 250 contestants, this series' competition was won by Owen McKenzie. During its broadcast, the series averaged around 3.53 million viewers.

Series Overview

Qualifier
In the course of the five qualifier rounds, the contestants faced a variety of different obstacles in each round, alongside Quintuple Steps and Warped Wall. The most common featured included Floating Tiles, Jump Hang - the obstacle featured different ways of reaching the cargo net it used - and Spinning Logs, while other obstacles used included Frame Slider, Silk Slider, Pole Rider, Ring Toss, Swing Frames, Swing Circles, Double Tilt Ladder, Spinning Hoops, Curtain Slider, and UFO.

Qualifier 1 Results

Qualifier 2 Results

Qualifier 3 Results

Qualifier 4 Results

Qualifier 5 Results

Semi-finals
For the semi-finals of this series, the semi-finalists had to complete Stage 1 of the course within two minutes. Alongside the Quintuple Steps and Warped Wall, they also had to contend with Barrel Rider, Spinning Log, a new variation of Jump Hang, and Spider Jump. Upon completing the stage, they then faced the obstacles of Stage 2, consisting of Wind Chimes, Arm Rings, and Chimney Climb.

Semi-Finals Results

Final
For the finals of this series, only two of the three stages of obstacles were conducted. Stage 1 required finalists to complete nine obstacles - Quintuple Steps, Pipe Slider, Paddle Boards, Jump Hang, Spider Jump, Warped Wall, Chain Swing, Spinning Bridge, and Invisible Ladder - within three minutes. Of the finalists that took this stage on, only three of them successfully completed the course - Timothy Shieff, Toby Segar and Owen McKenzie.

Stage 2 required the remaining finalists to complete five obstacles - Rope Jungle, Salmon Ladder, Unstable Bridge, Cycle Road, and Wall Lift - within 75 seconds. None managed to complete the course, being defeated by Salmon Ladder, thus the winner was determined by overall progress. Of the three finalists, McKenzie was declared the winner, managing to get further on the obstacle than Shieff and Segar.

Ratings

References

2016 British television seasons
Ninja Warrior UK